Paweł Domagała (born 19 January 1984) is a Polish actor in theater, film and television, and singer since 2016.

In 2014, Paweł Domagała appeared in the comedy film Wkręceni with Piotr Adamczyk and Bartosz Opania. He and Opania reprised their roles in the sequel Wkręceni 2.

Filmography

Stage

Discography

Studio albums

Singles

Guest appearances

References

External links
 

1984 births
Polish male actors
Living people
Aleksander Zelwerowicz National Academy of Dramatic Art in Warsaw alumni